Zoila Augusta Emperatriz Chavarri del Castillo (born Zoila Emperatriz Chavarri Castillo; September 13, 1922 – November 1, 2008), known as Yma Sumac (or Imma Sumack), was a Peruvian-born vocalist. "Ima sumaq" means "how beautiful" in Quechua. She has also been called Queen of Exotica and is considered a pioneer of world music. She won a Guinness World Record for the Greatest Range of Musical Value in 1956.  Her debut album, Voice of the Xtabay (1950), peaked at number one in the Billboard 200, and its single, "Virgin of the Sun God (Taita Inty)", reached number one on the UK Singles Chart. It sold a million copies worldwide, becoming an international success in the 1950s. Albums like Legend of the Sun Virgin (1952), Fuego del Ande (1959) and Mambo! (1955), were other successes.

In 1951, Sumac became the first Latin American female singer to debut on Broadway. In "Chuncho (The Forest Creatures)" (1953), she developed her own technical singing, named "double voice" or "triple coloratura". At the same time, she performed in the Carnegie Hall and Lewisohn Stadium. In 1960 she became the first Latin American woman to get a phonograph record star on the Hollywood Walk of Fame. Afterwards she toured around the Soviet Union, selling more than 20 million tickets. According to Variety in 1974, Sumac had more than 3000 concerts "covering the entire globe", breaking any previous records by a performer. V included her into the one of the 9 international fashion icons of all times in 2010. She has sold over 40 million records, which makes her the best-selling Peruvian singer in history.

Early life
Sumac was born Zoila Emperatriz Chavarri Castillo on September 13, 1922 in Callao. Then the family (a middle class one) moved to Cajamarca, where she spent her childhood. Her parents were the civic leader Sixto Chavarri (Cajamarca) and the schoolteacher Emilia Castillo (Ancash). Sumac was the youngest of six children. Growing up with the air of the Andean mountains, imitating the birds and other animals, she was "unintentionally making" her huge vocal range. In 1934, she traveled to live in Lima along her relatives. After being privately tutored from the age of 5, she entered a Catholic school in 1935.

Career

Probably Sumac's first appearance was on August 16, 1938, with Moises Vivanco in a religious festival at Callao. She graduated high school in 1940. She recorded at least 18 tracks of Peruvian folk songs in Buenos Aires, Argentina in 1943. These early recordings for the Odeon label featured composer Moisés Vivanco's troupe Compañía Peruana de Arte, of 16 Peruvian dancers, singers, and musicians.

She was discovered by Les Baxter and signed by Capitol Records in 1950, at which time her stage name became Yma Sumac. Her first album, Voice of the Xtabay, launched a period of fame that included performances at the Hollywood Bowl and Carnegie Hall.

In 1950, she made her first tour to Europe and Africa, and debuted at the Royal Albert Hall in London and the Royal Festival Hall before the future Queen of England. She presented more than 80 concerts in London and 16 concerts in Paris. A second tour took her to the Far East: Persia, Afghanistan, Pakistan, Burma, Thailand, Sumatra, the Philippines, and Australia. Her fame in countries like Greece, Israel and Russia made her change her two-week stay to six months. During the 1950s, she produced a series of best-selling  recordings of lounge music featuring Hollywood-style arrangements of Incan and South American folk songs, working with Les Baxter and Billy May. The combination of her extraordinary voice, exotic looks, and stage personality made her a hit with American audiences. Sumac appeared in a Broadway musical, Flahooley, in 1951, as a foreign princess who brings Aladdin's lamp to an American toy factory to have it repaired. The show's score was by Sammy Fain and Yip Harburg, but her three numbers were the work of Vivanco, with one co-written by Vivanco and Fain. Flahooley closed quickly, but the Capitol recording of the show continues to sell well as a cult classic, in part because it also marked the Broadway debut of Barbara Cook.

The 1950s were the years of  Sumac's greatest  popularity; She played Carnegie Hall, the Roxy Theatre with Danny Kaye, Las Vegas nightclubs and concert tours of South America and Europe. She put out a number of hit albums for Capitol Records, such as Mambo! (1954) and Fuego del Ande (1959).  During the height of Sumac's popularity, she appeared in the films Secret of the Incas (1954) with Charlton Heston and Robert Young, and Omar Khayyam (1957).

She became a U.S. citizen on July 22, 1955. In 1959, she performed Jorge Bravo de Rueda's classic song "Vírgenes del Sol" on her album Fuego del Ande. In 1957 Sumac and Vivanco divorced, after Vivanco sired twins with another woman. They remarried that same year, but a second divorce followed in 1965. Apparently due to financial difficulties, Sumac and the original Inka Taky Trio went on a world tour in 1960, which lasted for five years. They performed in 40 cities in the Soviet Union for over six months, and a film was shot recording some moments of the tour, and afterward throughout Europe, Asia and Latin America. Their performance in Bucharest, Romania, was recorded as the album Recital, her only live in concert record. Sumac spent the rest of the 1960s performing sporadically.

Personal life
She married Moisés Vivanco on June 6, 1942. After this date, Moisés and Yma toured South America and Mexico as a group of fourteen musicians called Imma Sumack and the Conjunto Folklorico Peruano.  Some people in Peru did not appreciate her style of singing, most notably the writer Jose Maria Arguedas (La Prensa, 1944). In 1946, Sumac and Vivanco moved to New York City where they performed as the Inka Taqui Trio, Sumac singing soprano, Vivanco on guitar, and her cousin, Cholita Rivero, singing contralto and dancing. The group was unable to attain any success; however, their participation in the South American Music Festival in Carnegie Hall was reviewed positively. In 1949, Yma gave birth to their only child Carlos.

Vocal range 
She had five octaves according to some reports, but other reports (and recordings) document four-and-a-half at the peak of her singing career. (A typical trained singer has a range of about three octaves.)

In one live recording of "Chuncho", she sang a range of over four and a half octaves, from B2 to G7. She sang notes in the low baritone register as well as notes above the range of an ordinary soprano. Both low and high extremes can be heard in the song "Chuncho (The Forest Creatures)" (1953).

In 1954, composer and music critic Virgil Thomson described Sumac's voice as "very low and warm, very high and birdlike," noting that her range "is very close to five octaves, but is in no way inhuman or outlandish in sound." In 2012, audio recording restoration expert John H. Haley favorably compared Sumac's tone to opera singers Isabella Colbran, Maria Malibran, and Pauline Viardot.

Sumac could emit notes from above a coloratura soprano to the low notes of a bass and had one of the widest vocal ranges. She was able to emit notes from the tessitura of sopranino, soprano, mezzo-soprano, contralto, tenor, baritone and bass, and was the only person able to do the triple coloratura or the trill of the birds. Her singing voice ranged from B2 to G7.

One source claims that in the song "K'arawi", she reached D8 (at 00:26). If true this would extend her vocal range to over five octaves, perhaps even six.

In the song "Chuncho" she sang from B2 (at 0:40) to C7 (at 2:56).

In this live performance of "Supay Taki", she performs a duet with the flute that attains E6.

Later career

In 1971, Sumac released a rock album, Miracles. She performed in concert from time to time during the 1970s in Peru and later in New York at the Chateau Madrid and Town Hall. In the 1980s, she resumed her career under the management of Alan Eichler, and had a number of concerts both in the United States and abroad, including the Hollywood Roosevelt Cinegrill, New York's Ballroom in 1987 (where she was held over for seven weeks to SRO crowds) and several San Francisco shows at the Theatre on the Square among others.
In 1987, she recorded "I Wonder" from the Disney film Sleeping Beauty for Stay Awake, an album of songs from Disney movies, produced by Hal Willner. She sang "Ataypura" during a March 19, 1987, appearance on Late Night with David Letterman. She recorded a new German "techno" dance record, "Mambo ConFusion".

In 1989, she sang again at the Ballroom in New York and returned to Europe for the first time in 30 years to headline the BRT's "Gala van de Gouden Bertjes" New Year's Eve TV special in Brussels as well as the "Etoile Palace" program in Paris hosted by Frederic Mitterrand. In March 1990, she played the role of Heidi in Stephen Sondheim's Follies, in Long Beach, California, her first attempt at serious theater since Flahooley in 1951.

She also gave several concerts in the summer of 1996 in San Francisco and Hollywood as well as two more in Montreal, Canada, in July 1997 as part of the Montreal International Jazz Festival. In 1992, she declined to appear in a documentary for German television entitled Yma Sumac – Hollywoods Inkaprinzessin (Yma Sumac – Hollywood's Inca Princess). With the resurgence of lounge music in the late 1990s, Sumac's profile rose again when the song "Ataypura" was featured in the Coen Brothers film The Big Lebowski.

Her song "Bo Mambo" appeared in a commercial for Kahlúa liquor and was sampled for the song "Hands Up" by The Black Eyed Peas. The song "Gopher Mambo" was used in the films Ordinary Decent Criminal, Happy Texas, Spy Games, and Confessions of a Dangerous Mind, among others. "Gopher Mambo" was used in an act of the Cirque Du Soleil show Quidam, as a musical motif in the Russian show  Kukhnya(along with "Bo Mambo" and "Taki Rari"), and in an iPhone commercial in 2020. The songs "Goomba Boomba" and "Malambo No. 1" appeared in Death to Smoochy. A sample from "Malambo No.1" was used in Robin Thicke's "Everything I Can't Have". Sumac is also mentioned in the lyrics of the 1980s song "Joe le taxi" by Vanessa Paradis, and her album Mambo! is the record that Belinda Carlisle pulls out of its jacket in the video for "Mad About You". "Gopher Mambo" is used as the opening song in the British version of the television series "Ten Percent."

On May 6, 2006, Sumac flew to Lima, where she was presented the Orden del Sol award by Peruvian President Alejandro Toledo and the Jorge Basadre medal by the Universidad Nacional Mayor de San Marcos.

Death
Sumac died on November 1, 2008, aged 86, at an assisted living home in Los Angeles, California, nine months after being diagnosed with colon cancer. She was interred at the Hollywood Forever Cemetery in the "Sanctuary of Memories" section.

On September 13, 2016, a Google Doodle depicted Sumac.

September 20, 2022 a new memorial bust statue was unveiled at her final resting place, at the Hollywood Forever Cemetery, in honor of Yma Sumac's 100th anniversary of her birth.

Myths 
Stories published in the 1950s claimed that she was an Incan princess, directly descended from Atahualpa. The government of Peru in 1946 formally supported her claim to be descended from Atahualpa, the last Incan emperor. However, her biographer, Nicholas E. Limansky, claimed that her Incan royal origin was not true. "Hollywood took this nice girl who wanted to be a folk singer, dressed her up and said she was a princess. And she acted like it," according to Limansky.

Discography
A 1943 recording session in Argentina included 23 songs, released on 78 rpm Odeon Records.  Sumac's 1952 album Legend of the Sun Virgin was reissued in 2020 (digitally and on vinyl records) by Madrid label Ellas Rugen (Ladies Who Roar) Records, dedicated to the greatest female Latin American singers of the second half of the 20th century.

Albums
 Voice of the Xtabay (Capitol, 1950)
 Legend of the Sun Virgin (Capitol, 1952)
 Inca Taqui (Capitol, 1953)
 Mambo! (Capitol, 1954)
 Legend of the Jivaro (Capitol, 1957)
 Fuego Del Ande (Capitol, 1959)
 Recital (Electrecord, 1961)
 Miracles (London, 1971)

Compilations
 The Spell of Yma Sumac (Pair, 1987)
 Amor Indio (Saludos Amigos, 1994)
 Shou Condor (Promo Sound, 1997)
 The Ultimate Yma Sumac Collection (Capitol, 2000)
 Virgin of the Sun God (Old Fashion, 2002)
 The Exotic Sounds of Yma Sumac (Sounds of the World, 2002)
 Queen of Exotica (Universe, 2005)

Filmography (partial)

References

Further listening
 , (Jorge Bravo de Rueda)

Further reading
 Garth Cartwright, "Yma Sumac – Peruvian-born singer marketed in the US as an Inca princess", obituary in The Guardian, November 16, 2008.
Carolina A Miranda, "On the trail of Yma Sumac: the exotica legend comes from Peru but her career was all Hollywood" in The Los Angeles Times of March 23, 2017. Accessed 2017-04-19.

External links
 
 Yma Sumac, August 8, 1950. Malibu, Hollywood Bowl, Recording Studio, Residence (90 photos), by Peter Stackpole for LIFE magazine

1922 births
2008 deaths
Exotica
Mambo musicians
20th-century Peruvian women singers
20th-century Peruvian singers
Singers with a five-octave vocal range
Recipients of the Order of the Sun of Peru
Peruvian emigrants to the United States
People with acquired American citizenship
Deaths from colorectal cancer
Deaths from cancer in California
Burials at Hollywood Forever Cemetery
Capitol Records artists
20th-century Peruvian actresses
20th-century American women singers
20th-century American singers
21st-century American women